The 29th Infantry Division (29th ID), also known as the "Blue and Gray Division", is an infantry division of the United States Army based in Fort Belvoir, Virginia. It is currently a formation of the U.S. Army National Guard and contains units from Virginia, Maryland, Kentucky, North Carolina, South Carolina and West Virginia.

Formed in 1917, the division deployed to France as a part of the American Expeditionary Force during World War I. Called up for service again in World War II, the division's 116th Regiment, attached to the First Infantry Division, was in the first wave of troops ashore during Operation Neptune, the landings in Normandy, France. It supported a special Ranger unit tasked with clearing strong points at Omaha Beach. The rest of the 29th ID came ashore later, then advanced to Saint-Lô, and eventually through France and into Germany.

Following the end of World War II, the division saw frequent reorganizations and deactivations. Although the 29th did not see combat through most of the next 50 years, it participated in numerous training exercises throughout the world. It eventually saw deployments to Bosnia (SFOR10) and Kosovo (KFOR) as command elements, and units of the division continue to deploy to locations such as Guantanamo Bay Naval Base and to the War in Afghanistan as a part of the Global War on Terrorism's Operation Enduring Freedom, and also to the Iraq War, as a part of its Operation Iraqi Freedom and Operation New Dawn. In recent years, the Division has continued answering the call supporting Operation Spartan Shield in forward deployed locations.

In 2016, two separate elements of the 29th deployed overseas. In July more than 80 soldiers deployed in support of anti-ISIL operations (dubbed Operation Inherent Resolve by the U.S. government). In October, more than 450 29th soldiers deployed in support of Operation Spartan Shield.

History
The 29th Division was first constituted on paper on 18 July 1917, three months after the American entry into World War I, in the U.S. Army National Guard. Troops came from Delaware, Maryland, New Jersey, Virginia, and the District of Columbia. As the division was composed of men from states that had units that fought for both the North and South during the American Civil War, it was nicknamed the "Blue and Gray" division, after the blue uniforms of the Union and the gray uniforms of the Confederate armies. The division was organized as a unit on 25 August 1917 at Camp McClellan, Alabama. In January 1918, the Delaware units were relieved from assignment to the division.

World War I
The division, commanded throughout its existence by Major General Charles G. Morton, departed for the Western Front in June 1918 to join the American Expeditionary Forces (AEF). The division's advance detachment reached Brest, France on 8 June. In late September, the 29th received orders to join the U.S. First Army's Meuse–Argonne offensive as part of the French XVII Corps. During its 21 days in combat, the 29th Division advanced seven kilometers, captured 2,148 prisoners, and knocked out over 250 machine guns or artillery pieces. Thirty percent of the division became casualties—170 officers and 5,691 enlisted men were killed or wounded. Shortly thereafter the Armistice with Germany was signed on 11 November 1918, ending hostilities between the Central Powers and the Allied Powers. The division returned to the United States in May 1919. It demobilized on 30 May at Camp Dix, New Jersey,

Order of battle, 1917–1918
 Headquarters, 29th Division
 57th Infantry Brigade
 113th Infantry Regiment (former 4th New Jersey Infantry less Headquarters Company, Machine Gun Company, Company L, and part of Supply Company, 1st New Jersey Infantry less Company K, and 2nd New Jersey Infantry less band, Machine Gun Company, and Companies G and L)
 114th Infantry Regiment (former 3rd New Jersey Infantry less band, Machine Gun Company, and Companies I and L, and 5th New Jersey Infantry less Company F)
 111th Machine Gun Battalion (former Machine Gun Company, 4th New Jersey Infantry, and Machine Gun Company and Company L, 2nd New Jersey Infantry)
 58th Infantry Brigade
 115th Infantry Regiment (former 1st Maryland Infantry less Company H, 5th Maryland Infantry less Headquarters, Supply, and Machine Gun Companies, and 4th Maryland Infantry less band, Machine Gun Company, and Companies A, B, D, E, F, H, and I)
 116th Infantry Regiment (former 2nd Virginia Infantry, 1st Virginia Infantry less band) and Machine Gun Company, and 4th Virginia Infantry less Headquarters Company, Machine Gun Company, and Companies D, I, and M)
 112th Machine Gun Battalion (former Company H, 1st Maryland Infantry, Machine Gun Company, 4th Maryland Infantry, and Machine Gun Company and Company D, 4th Virginia Infantry)
 54th Field Artillery Brigade
 110th Field Artillery Regiment (75 mm) (former Headquarters and Supply Companies, 5th Maryland Infantry, Batteries A, B and C, Maryland Field Artillery, Batteries A and B, D.C. Field Artillery, 1st Squadron, D.C. Cavalry, and detachment from Company A, Virginia Signal Corps)
 111th Field Artillery Regiment (75 mm) (former 1st Virginia Field Artillery, Headquarters Company and Companies I and M, 4th Virginia Infantry, and detachment from Company A, Virginia Signal Corps)
 112th Field Artillery Regiment (155 mm) (former 1st New Jersey Field Artillery less Battery F, Troops B and D, 1st New Jersey Cavalry, and detachment from Company A, Virginia Signal Corps)
 104th Trench Mortar Battery (former Battery F, New Jersey Field Artillery)
 110th Machine Gun Battalion (former Machine Gun Company, 5th Maryland Infantry, Machine Gun Company, 4th New Jersey Infantry, and Machine Gun Company, 1st Virginia Infantry)
 104th Engineer Regiment (former 1st Battalion. New Jersey Engineers, Company K, 1st New Jersey Infantry, Company G, 2nd New Jersey Infantry, Companies I and L, 3rd New Jersey Infantry, Co. L, 4th New Jersey Infantry, and Co. F, 5th New Jersey Infantry)
 104th Field Signal Battalion (former Companies A and C, New Jersey Signal Corps, and Company B, D.C. Signal Corps)
 Headquarters Troop, 29th Division (detachment from 1st Squadron, New Jersey Cavalry)
 104th Train Headquarters and Military Police (former Troops A and C, 1st Squadron New Jersey Cavalry, and Troop A, Maryland Cavalry)
 104th Ammunition Train (former 1st Squadron, Virginia Cavalry, and individual transfers)
 104th Supply Train (individual transfers)
 104th Engineer Train (individual transfers)
 104th Sanitary Train
 113th, 114th, 115th, and 116th Ambulance Companies and Field Hospitals (former 1st Maryland Ambulance Company, 1st Virginia Ambulance Company, 1st New Jersey Field Hospital, 1st Maryland Field Hospital, and 1st Virginia Field Hospital)

Interwar period

The 29th was reconstituted in the National Guard in 1921, assigned to the III Corps, and allotted to the states of Maryland and Virginia, and the District of Columbia. New Jersey units that had been part of the 29th Division in World War I were assigned to the new 44th Division, that encompassed troops from New Jersey and New York. When 155 mm howitzers were returned to infantry divisions beginning in 1929, a  formerly non-divisional unit from Pennsylvania was assigned to the division. The division trained as a unit during the 1935 First Army maneuvers at Fort Indiantown Gap, Pennsylvania, and during the 1939 First Army maneuvers at Manassas, Virginia.

Order of battle, 1939
 Headquarters, 29th Division (Washington, D.C.)
 Headquarters, Special Troops, 29th Division (Washington, D.C.)
 Headquarters Company, 29th Division (Washington, D.C.)
 29th Military Police Company (Washington, D.C.)
 29th Signal Company (Norfolk, Virginia)
 104th Ordnance Company (Medium) (Washington, D.C.)
 29th Tank Company (Light) (Danville, Virginia)
 58th Infantry Brigade (Baltimore, Maryland)
 1st Infantry Regiment (MD) (Frederick, Maryland)
 5th Infantry Regiment (MD) (Baltimore, Maryland)
 91st Infantry Brigade (Richmond, Virginia)
 1st Infantry Regiment (VA) (Richmond, Virginia)
 116th Infantry Regiment (Lynchburg, Virginia)
 54th Field Artillery Brigade (Norfolk, Virginia)
 104th Ammunition Train (Virginia National Guard)
 110th Field Artillery Regiment (75 mm) (Pikesville, Maryland)
 111th Field Artillery Regiment (75 mm) (Hampton, Virginia)
 176th Field Artillery Regiment (155 mm) (Pittsburgh, Pennsylvania)
 121st Engineer Regiment (Washington, D.C.)
 104th Medical Regiment (Baltimore, Maryland)
 104th Quartermaster Regiment (Baltimore, Maryland)

Italics indicates state of headquarters allocation; headquarters not organized or inactive.

World War II
At the outbreak of World War II, the U.S. Army began buildup and reorganization of its fighting forces. The division was called into active service on 3 February 1941. Elements of the division were then sent to Fort Meade, Maryland for training. The 57th and 58th Infantry Brigades were inactivated as part of an army-wide removal of brigades from divisions. Instead, the core units of the division were its three infantry regiments, along with supporting units. On 12 March 1942, over three months after the Japanese attack on Pearl Harbor and the subsequent American entrance into World War II, with this reorganization complete the division was redesignated as the 29th Infantry Division and began preparing for overseas deployment to Europe.

Order of battle, 1943–1945
 Headquarters, 29th Infantry Division
 115th Infantry Regiment
 116th Infantry Regiment
 175th Infantry Regiment
 Headquarters and Headquarters Battery, 29th Infantry Division Artillery
 110th Field Artillery Battalion (105 mm)
 111th Field Artillery Battalion (105 mm)
 224th Field Artillery Battalion (105 mm)
 227th Field Artillery Battalion (155 mm)
 121st Engineer Combat Battalion
 104th Medical Battalion
 29th Cavalry Reconnaissance Troop (Mechanized)
 Headquarters, Special Troops, 29th Infantry Division
 Headquarters Company, 29th Infantry Division
 729th Ordnance Light Maintenance Company
 29th Quartermaster Company
 29th Signal Company
 Military Police Platoon
 Band
 29th Counterintelligence Corps Detachment

It was based throughout England and Scotland, where it immediately began training for an invasion of northern Europe across the English Channel. In May 1943 the division moved to the Devon–Cornwall peninsula and started conducting simulated attacks against fortified positions. At this time the division was assigned to V Corps of the U.S. First Army. In July the divisional commander, Major General Gerow, was promoted to command V Corps and Major General Charles Hunter Gerhardt assumed command of the division, remaining in this post for the rest of the war.

Operation Overlord
D-Day of Operation Neptune, the cross-channel invasion of Normandy, finally came on 6 June 1944. Neptune was the assault phase of the larger Operation Overlord, codename for the Allied campaign to liberate France from the Germans. The 29th Infantry Division sent the 116th Infantry to support the western flank of the veteran 1st Infantry Division's 16th Infantry at Omaha Beach. Omaha was known to be the most difficult of the five landing beaches, due to its rough terrain and bluffs overlooking the beach, which had been well fortified by its German defenders of the 352nd Infantry Division. The 116th Infantry was assigned four sectors of the beach; Easy Green, Dog Red, Dog White, and Dog Green.

As the ships were traveling to the beach, the heavy seas, combined with the chaos of the fighting caused most of the landing force to be thrown off-course and most of the 116th Infantry missed its landing spots. Most of the regiment's tank support, launched from too far off-shore, foundered and sank in the channel. The soldiers of the 116th Infantry were the first to hit the beach at 0630, coming under heavy fire from German fortifications. Company A, from the Virginia National Guard in Bedford was annihilated by overwhelming fire as it landed on the 116th's westernmost section of the beach, along with half of Company A, B, and C of the 2nd Ranger Battalion and the 5th Rangers Battalion which was landing to the west of the 116th. The catastrophic losses suffered by this small Virginia community led to it being selected for the site of the National D-Day Memorial. The 1st Infantry Division's forces ran into similar fortifications on the eastern half of the beach, suffering massive casualties coming ashore. By 0830, the landings were called off for lack of space on the beach, as the Americans on Omaha Beach were unable to overcome German fortifications guarding the beach exits. Lieutenant General Omar Bradley, commanding the American First Army, considered evacuating the survivors and landing the rest of the divisions elsewhere. However, by noon, elements of the American forces had been able to organize and advance off the beach, and the landings resumed. By nightfall, the division headquarters landed on the beach with about 60 percent of the division's total strength, and began organizing the push inland. On 7 June, a second wave of 20,000 reinforcements from both the 1st and 29th Divisions was sent ashore. By the end of D-Day, 2,400 men from the two divisions had become casualties on Omaha Beach. Added to casualties at other beaches and air-drops made the total casualties for the Normandy landings 6,500 Americans and 3,000 British and Canadians, lighter numbers than expected.

The entire division had landed in Normandy by 7 June. By 9 June, Omaha Beach was secure and the division occupied Isigny. On 14 July, the division was reassigned to XIX Corps, part of the First Army, itself part of the 12th Army Group.

Breakout
The division cut across the Elle River and advanced slowly toward Saint-Lô, fighting bitterly in the Normandy hedgerow country. German reserves formed a new defensive front outside the town, and American forces fought a fierce battle with them two miles outside of the town. German forces used the dense bocage foliage to their advantage, mounting fierce resistance in house-to-house fighting in the ravaged Saint-Lô. By the end of the fight, the Germans were relying on artillery support to hold the town following the depletion of the infantry contingent. The 29th Division, which was already undermanned after heavy casualties on D-Day, was even further depleted in the intense fighting for Saint-Lô. Eventually, the 29th was able to capture the city in a direct assault, supported by airstrikes from P-47 Thunderbolts.

Brittany
After taking Saint-Lô, on 18 July, the division joined in the battle for Vire, capturing that strongly held city by 7 August. It continued to face stiff German resistance as it advanced to key positions southeast of Saint-Lô It was then reassigned to V Corps, and then again to VIII Corps. Turning west, the 29th took part in the assault on Brest which lasted from 25 August until 18 September.

Germany
After a short rest, the division returned to XIX Corps and took part of the Battle of Aachen by moving to defensive positions along the Teveren-Geilenkirchen line supporting the 30th Infantry Division in Germany and maintained those positions through October. On 16 November, the division began its drive to the Roer River, blasting its way through Siersdorf, Setterich, Durboslar, and Bettendorf, and reaching the Roer by the end of the month. Heavy fighting reduced in Jülich Sportplatz and the Hasenfeld Gut on 8 December. The Division did not take part in the Battle of the Bulge as they were held in reserve for equipment refitting and received replacements of fresh troops arriving from England and France after training for weeks.

From 8 December 1944 to 23 February 1945, the division was assigned to XIII Corps and held defensive positions along the Rur and prepared for the next major offensive, Operation Grenade. The division was reassigned to XIX Corps, and the attack jumped off across the Rur on 23 February, and carried the division through Jülich, Broich, Immerath, and Titz, to Mönchengladbach by 1 March 1945. The division was out of combat in March. In early April the division was reassigned to XVI Corps, where the 116th Infantry helped mop up in the Ruhr Pocket. On 19 April 1945 the division, assigned to XIII Corps, pushed to the Elbe River and held defensive positions until 4 May and also made contact with Soviet troops. Meanwhile, the 175th Infantry cleared the Klotze Forest. After V-E Day, the division was on military occupation duty in the Bremen enclave. It was assigned to XVI Corps again for this assignment.

Losses, decorations, demobilization

Casualties
Total battle casualties: 20,620
Killed in action: 3,887
Wounded in action: 15,541
Missing in action: 347
Prisoner of war: 845

From July 1943, the 29th Infantry Division was commanded by Major General Charles H. Gerhardt. The division had such a high casualty rate that it was said that Gerhardt actually commanded three divisions: one on the field of battle, one in the hospital and one in the cemetery. The 29th Infantry Division lost 3,887 killed in action, 15,541 wounded in action, 347 missing in action, 845 prisoners of war, in addition to 8,665 non-combat casualties, during 242 days of combat. This amounted to over 200 percent of the division's normal strength. The division, in turn, took 38,912 German prisoners of war.

Soldiers of the 29th Infantry Division were awarded five Medals of Honor, 44 Distinguished Service Crosses, one Distinguished Service Medal, 854 Silver Star Medals, 17 Legion of Merit Medals, 24 Soldier's Medals, 6,308 Bronze Star Medals, and 176 Air Medals during the conflict. The division itself was awarded four distinguished unit citations and four campaign streamers for the conflict.

The division remained on occupation duty until the end of 1945. Camp Grohn near Bremen was the division headquarters until January 1946. The 29th Infantry Division returned to the United States in January 1946 and was demobilized and inactivated on 17 January 1946 at Camp Kilmer, New Jersey.

Reactivation
On 23 October 1946, the division was reactivated in Norfolk, Virginia. However, its subordinate elements were not fully manned and activated for several years. It resumed its National Guard status, seeing weekend and summer training assignments but no major contingencies over the next few years.

In 1959, the division was reorganized under the Pentomic five battle group division organization. Ewing's 29th Infantry Division: A Short History of a Fighting Division says that several Maryland infantry and engineer companies were reorganized to form 1st Med Tank Bn, 115th Armor; the 29th Aviation Company was established; and the 1st Reconnaissance Squadron, 183rd Armor, was established in Virginia as the division's reconnaissance squadron.
In 1963, the division was reorganized in accordance with the Reorganization Objective Army Divisions plan, eliminating its regimental commands in favor of brigades. The division took command of 1st Brigade, 29th Infantry Division and 2nd Brigade, 29th Infantry Division of the Virginia Army National Guard, as well as 3rd Brigade, 29th Infantry Division of the Maryland Army National Guard. The division continued its service in the National Guard under this new organization.

In 1968, in the middle of the Vietnam War, the Army inactivated several National Guard and Reserve divisions as part of a realignment of resources. The 29th Infantry Division was one of the divisions inactivated. During that time, the division's subordinate units were reassigned to other National Guard divisions. 1st Brigade was inactivated, while 2nd Brigade was redesignated as the 116th Infantry Brigade, and the 3rd Brigade was redesignated as 3rd Brigade, 28th Infantry Division.

On 6 June 1984, 40 years after the landings on Omaha Beach, the Army announced that it would reactivate the 29th Infantry Division, organized as a light infantry division, as part of a reorganization of the National Guard. On 30 September 1985, the division was reactivated at Fort Belvoir, Virginia, with units from the Virginia Army National Guard (VAARNG) and Maryland Army National Guard (MDARNG). The 116th Infantry Brigade was redesignated the 1st Brigade, 29th Division, while the 58th Infantry Brigade became the 3rd Brigade. That year, the division also received its distinctive unit insignia.

Organization 1989 

At the end of the Cold War the division was a joint Virginia Army National Guard (VAARNG) and Maryland Army National Guard (MDARNG) unit. Virginia provided the division's headquarters, the 1st and 2nd Brigade, the Division Artillery (with one MDARNG artillery battalion) and other minor units, while Maryland provided the 3rd Brigade, Aviation Brigade, 29th Infantry Division (with two VAARNG aviation companies), the Division Support Command (with one VAARNG aviation company) and other minor units. The division was organized as follows:
 29th Infantry Division (Light), Fort Belvoir (VAARNG)
 Headquarters and Headquarters Company, Fort Belvoir (VAARNG)
 1st Brigade, Staunton (VAARNG)
 Headquarters and Headquarters Company, Staunton
 1st Battalion, 116th Infantry, Roanoke
 2nd Battalion, 116th Infantry, Lynchburg
 3rd Battalion, 116th Infantry, Winchester
 2nd Brigade, Fort A.P. Hill (VAARNG) (Would receive an additional infantry battalion from the 3rd Brigade during wartime)
 Headquarters and Headquarters Company, Fort A.P. Hill
 1st Battalion, 170th Infantry, Alexandria
 1st Battalion, 183rd Infantry, Richmond
 3rd Brigade, Pikesville (MDARNG)
 Headquarters and Headquarters Company
 1st Battalion, 115th Infantry, Silver Spring
 2nd Battalion, 115th Infantry, Chestertown
 1st Battalion, 175th Infantry, Baltimore
 2nd Battalion, 175th Infantry, Dundalk
 Aviation Brigade, 29th Infantry Division, Weide Army Airfield (MDARNG)
 Headquarters and Headquarters Company, Weide Army Airfield
 1st Squadron, 158th Cavalry, Annapolis (OH-58A Kiowa & AH-1E Cobra helicopters)
 1st Battalion, 224th Aviation (Attack), Weide Army Airfield (OH-58A Kiowa & AH-1E Cobra helicopters)
 Company D, 224th Aviation (Assault), Sandston Army Airfield (VAARNG) (UH-60A Black Hawk helicopters)
 Company E, 224th Aviation (General Support), Sandston Army Airfield (VAARNG) (UH-1H Iroquois helicopters)
 29th Infantry Division Artillery, Sandston (VAARNG)
 Headquarters and Headquarters Battery, Sandston
 2nd Battalion, 110th Field Artillery, Pikesville (MDARNG) (18 × M101 105mm towed howitzers)
 1st Battalion, 111th Field Artillery, Norfolk (attached 18 × M198 155mm towed howitzers unit)
 2nd Battalion, 111th Field Artillery, Richmond (18 × M101 105mm towed howitzers)
 1st Battalion, 246th Field Artillery, Danville (18 × M101 105mm towed howitzers)
 Battery E, 111th Field Artillery, Emporia (8 × M198 155mm towed howitzers)
 29th Infantry Division Support Command, Towson (MDARNG)
 Headquarters and Headquarters Company, Towson
 104th Medical Battalion, Catonsville
 229th Supply & Transportation Battalion, Baltimore
 729th Maintenance Battalion, Havre de Grace
 Company F, 224th Aviation (Aviation Intermediate Maintenance), Weide Army Airfield (VAARNG)
 3rd Battalion, 111th Air Defense Artillery, Portsmouth (VAARNG)
 229th Engineer Battalion, Fredericksburg (VAARNG)
 129th Signal Battalion, Bel Air (MDARNG)
 629th Military Intelligence Battalion, Greenbelt (MDARNG)
 29th Military Police Company, Pikesville (MDARNG)
 229th Chemical Company, Roanoke (VAARNG)
 29th Division Band, Roanoke (VAARNG)

Post Cold War
At the end of the Cold War, the Army saw further drawdowns and reductions in spending. The 29th Infantry Division was retained, however 2nd Brigade was inactivated in favor of assets from the inactivating 26th Infantry Division, which was redesignated the 26th Brigade, 29th Infantry Division.

The largest National Guard training exercise ever held in Virginia took place in July 1998, bringing units from the 29th Infantry Division together for one large infantry exercise. The Division Maneuver Exercise, dubbed Operation Chindit, brought together Guard units from Virginia and Maryland, as well as Massachusetts, New Jersey, Connecticut and the District of Columbia. The exercise began with the insertion of troops from the 29th Infantry Division's 1st and 3rd Brigades by UH-60 Blackhawk helicopters into strategic landing zones. NATO-member forces trained with the 29th Infantry Division throughout the exercise. In December 2008, the division also dispatched a task force to Camp Asaka near Tokyo, Japan for exercises with the Japanese Ground Self Defense Force called Yama Sakura 55, a bilateral exercise simulating an invasion of Japan.

Present day
In March 1994, during a time of post-Cold War reductions in the size of the Regular Army, the 505th Parachute Infantry Regiment was tasked to test a new concept. The Regiment's task was to organize, train, certify, and deploy a multi-component battalion-sized task force made up of National Guard, Army Reserve and Regular Army Soldiers to serve as the US Army's rotational Infantry Battalion for the Multi-National Force and Observers (MFO) in the Sinai Peninsula of Egypt.  The Soldiers selected for the unit reported to Fort Bragg, North Carolina in July 1994 to begin their training for the mission.

The task force was designated as the 4th Battalion, 505th Parachute Infantry Regiment, and carried the lineage of Company D, 505th Parachute Infantry Regiment, which had served throughout World War II and into the 1950s.  Also known as Task Force 4-505 or "The Sinai Battalion," it was formally activated on 4 November 1994. The battalion was made up of 88% National Guardsmen and Army Reservists from 32 different states, and 12% Regular Army Soldiers, most from the 82nd Airborne Division at Fort Bragg.  Virginia and Maryland Army National Guardsmen from the 29th Infantry Division (Light) provided the largest contingent for the battalion. All of the National Guard and Army Reserve Soldiers volunteered for a year of active duty in order to serve in the unit.  After completing six months of peacekeeping training at Fort Bragg, the 4th Battalion, 505th Parachute Infantry Regiment deployed to the Sinai from January through June 1995, then redeployed to Fort Bragg.  On 15 July 1995, the 4th Battalion was inactivated at Fort Bragg, and its Soldiers returned to their parent units.

Hundreds of soldiers from the 29th Infantry Division completed nine days of training on 16 June 2001 at Fort Polk, Louisiana, to prepare for their peacekeeping mission in Bosnia, as the second division headquarters to be deployed as a part of SFOR 10. In all, 2,085 National Guard soldiers from 16 states from Massachusetts to California served with the multinational force that operated in the US sector, MND-N. Their rotation began in October 2001 and lasted six months.

The 29th Infantry Division completed a two-week warfighter exercise at Fort Leavenworth, Kansas in late July 2003. Nearly 1,200 soldiers of the division participated in the training, which was overseen by First United States Army. Also engaged in the simulation war were about 150 soldiers of the New York Army National Guard's 42nd Infantry Division. The exercises covered a variety of operations, ranging from large scale contingencies to airborne and civil affairs operations.

In March 2004, the 3rd Battalion 116th Infantry of 500+ soldiers was mobilized for 579 days in support of Operation Enduring Freedom – Afghanistan. Following 4-month train up, the battalion deployed to Bagram Air Base Afghanistan where the unit split into two operational elements.  One element was stationed at Bagram where they were responsible for near base security and the theater-north Quick Reaction Force.  They executed 5, 10, and 20 kilometer ring patrols to increase force security and stayed ready to react at a moments notice to deploy anywhere in Afghanistan to react to "troops in contact" that requested support.  The other element moved south with the Bn Commander to control and shape operations in the Wardak and Ghazni provinces.  It was here that the 116th would take its first casualties by enemy contact since World War II.  SGT Bobby Beasley and SSG Craig Cherry were killed in an IED attack on a patrol in southern Ghazni near Gilan.  Within the first three months, the unit would deploy nearly every soldier around Bagram, and throughout the Wardak and Ghazni provinces during the first Afghan elections in which President Hamid Karzai was elected.  The unit would redeploy back to the United States in July 2005 highly decorated for its efforts during their mission following hundreds of successful combat patrols and engagements.

In 2005, 350 veterans, politicians, and soldiers representing the division went to Normandy and Paris, in France for the 60th anniversary of the D-Day landings. The Army National Guard organized a major ceremony for the 60th anniversary, as many of the veterans who participated in the invasion were in their 80s at that time, and the 60th anniversary was seen as the last major anniversary of the landings in which a large number of veterans could take part.

The division underwent major reorganization in 2006. A special troops battalion was added to the division's command structure, and its three brigades were redesignated. It as organized around three brigades; the 30th Heavy Brigade Combat Team of North Carolina, the 116th Infantry Brigade Combat Team of Virginia, and the Combat Aviation Brigade, 29th Infantry Division of Maryland.

In December 2006, the division took command of the Eastern region of Kosovo's peacekeeping force, to provide security in the region. The division's soldiers were part of a NATO multi-national task force consisting of units from the Ukraine, Greece, Poland, Romania, Armenia and Lithuania under the command of U.S. Army Brigadier General Douglas B. Earhart who concurrently served as the 29th's Deputy Commanding General.  The division returned to Fort Belvoir in November 2007.

After a three-month pre-deployment train-up at Mississippi's Camp Shelby, the 116th Infantry Brigade Combat Team deployed to Kuwait and Iraq in September 2007, as part of the Iraq War's Operation Iraqi Freedom, returning home in May 2008.

Approximately 72 Virginia and Maryland National Guard soldiers with the 29th ID deployed to Afghanistan from December 2010 to October 2011. As part of the 29th ID Security Partnering Team, the Soldiers were assigned to NATO's International Security Assistance Force Joint Command Security Partnering Team with the mission of assisting with the growth and development of the Afghan National Security Forces where they served as advisers and mentors to senior Afghan leaders. They were part of a NATO Coalition of 49 troop-contributing nations that Security Partnering personnel interacted with daily across Afghanistan.

They were replaced in November 2011 by a new team from the 29th Infantry Division. A team of 65 29th ID soldiers served in Afghanistan as a Security Partnering Team until July 2012.

The 29th ID suffered one casualty during this deployment. Maj. Robert Marchanti of the Maryland Army National Guard, was killed on 25 February 2012.

In 2014 the 29th ID twice sent soldiers to the Joint Multinational Readiness Center in Hohenfels, Germany to assist in the training of U.S. and multinational soldiers preparing to head to Kosovo as part of the Kosovo Force mission. The 29th ID soldiers performed as the KFOR staff, serving as subject matter experts, enforcing KFOR orders, systems and procedures, and working with JMRC to help the deploying troops achieve their training objectives.

The 29th ID currently serves as the Domestic All-Hazards Response Team (DART) in FEMA Regions 1 through 5 (states east of the Mississippi). In this role the 29th ID is prepared to assist state National Guard in their service to governors and citizens during an incident response. The DART provides defense support of civil authority capabilities in response to a catastrophic event. The DART conducts joint reception, staging, onward-movement and Integration of inbound OPCON forces and establishes base support installations and /or forward operating bases for sustaining operations.

On 24 July 2015, Brig. Gen. Blake C. Ortner took command of the 29th Infantry Division from Maj. Gen. Charles W. Whittington.

On 19 December 2016 the 29th Infantry Division assumed command of U.S. Army Central's intermediate division headquarters, Task Force Spartan, at Camp Arifjan, Kuwait.  This deployment includes 450 Virginia, Maryland and North Carolina Army National Guard soldiers and is the first time the 29th Infantry Division has been a part of Third Army since 1944, during WWII.

More than 80 members of the 29th deployed to Jordan in August 2016 where they assumed command of the military's joint operations center there to support Operation Inherent Resolve. Soldiers of the 29th led engagements and joint training with the Jordan Armed Forces and allied countries before returning in July 2017.

On 5 May 2018, Brig. Gen. John M. Epperly took command of the 29th Infantry Division from Maj. Gen. Blake C. Ortner. On 3 October 2020, Epperly was succeeded by Maj. Gen. John M. Rhodes.

Current organization
 
The 29th Infantry Division exercises training and readiness oversight of the following units, which are not organic: there is a division headquarters battalion, an armored brigade combat team, two infantry brigade combat teams, a combat aviation brigade, a field artillery brigade, a maneuver enhancement brigade, and a division sustainment brigade.
  29th Infantry Division Headquarters and Headquarters Battalion
 Headquarters and Support Company, Fort Belvoir, Virginia (VA NG)
 Company A (Operations), Fort Belvoir, Virginia (VA NG)
 Company B (Intelligence and Sustainment), Annapolis, Maryland (MD NG)
 Company C (Signal), Cheltenham, Maryland (MD NG)
 29th Infantry Division Band (VA NG)
  30th Armored Brigade Combat Team (ABCT) (NC NG)
 Headquarters and Headquarters Company (HHC)
  1st Squadron, 150th Cavalry Regiment (WV NG)
  1st Battalion, 252nd Armor Regiment (NC NG)
  4th Battalion, 118th Infantry Regiment (SC NG)
  1st Battalion, 120th Infantry Regiment (NC NG)
  1st Battalion, 113th Field Artillery Regiment (FAR) (NC NG)
 236th Brigade Engineer Battalion (BEB)
  230th Brigade Support Battalion (BSB) (NC NG)
  53rd Infantry Brigade Combat Team (IBCT) (FL NG)
 HHC
  1st Squadron, 153rd Cavalry Regiment
  1st Battalion, 124th Infantry Regiment
  2nd Battalion, 124th Infantry Regiment
  1st Battalion, 167th Infantry Regiment (AL NG)
 2nd Battalion, 116th FAR
 753rd BEB
 53rd BSB
  116th IBCT (VA NG)
 HHC
  2nd Squadron, 183rd Cavalry Regiment
  1st Battalion, 116th Infantry Regiment
  3rd Battalion, 116th Infantry Regiment
  1st Battalion, 149th Infantry Regiment (KY NG)
  1st Battalion, 111th FAR
  229th BEB
  429th BSB
  Combat Aviation Brigade, 29th Infantry Division (MD NG)
  1st Battalion, 285th Aviation Regiment (AZ NG)
  2d Battalion, 224th Aviation Regiment (VA NG)
  8th Battalion, 229th Aviation Regiment (USAR)
  1st Battalion, 111th Aviation Regiment (FL NG)
 248th Aviation Support Battalion (IA NG)
 1297th Combat Sustainment Support Battalion
 142nd Field Artillery Brigade
  Headquarters and Headquarters Battery (HHB) (Fayetteville, Arkansas)
  1st Battalion, 142nd FAR (Bentonville, Arkansas)
  2nd Battalion, 142nd FAR (Barling, Arkansas)
217th BSB (Booneville, Arkansas)
  Battery F, 142nd FAR (Fayetteville, Arkansas)
142d Signal Company (Fayetteville, Arkansas)
 226th Maneuver Enhancement Brigade 
 29th Infantry Division Sustainment Brigade

Honors

Unit decorations

Campaign streamers

Legacy
The 29th Infantry Division has been featured numerous times in popular media, particularly for its role on D-Day. The division's actions on Omaha Beach are featured prominently in the 1962 film The Longest Day, as well as in the 1998 film Saving Private Ryan. Soldiers of the division are featured in other films and television with smaller roles, such as in the 2009 film Inglourious Basterds and the 2005 film War of the Worlds.

The 29th Infantry Division is also featured in numerous video games related to World War II. The division's advance through Normandy and Europe is featured in the games Close Combat, Company of Heroes and Call of Duty 3, in which the player assumes the role of a soldier of the division.

A number of soldiers serving with the 29th Infantry Division have gone on to achieve notability for various reasons. Among them are highly decorated soldier Joseph A. Farinholt, soccer player James Ford, United States federal judge Alfred D. Barksdale, and historian Lawrence C. Wroth, generals Milton Reckord, Norman Cota, Charles D. W. Canham, and Donald Wilson. Major Thomas D. Howie who commanded 3d Battalion, 116th Infantry during the battle of St. Lo became immortalized as "The Major of St. Lo" for the honors rendered to him after being killed in action.

U.S. soldiers who received the Medal of Honor during service with the 29th Infantry Division include Henry Costin, Earle Davis Gregory, and Patrick Regan from World War I and Frank D. Peregory and Sherwood H. Hallman. from World War II.

See also 
 Joseph Balkoski, military historian and author of a five-volume history of the 29th Division in World War II
 Saving Private Ryan beach landing scene

References

Sources

External links

 History of the Twenty-ninth Division, "Blue and Gray," 1917–1919
 29th Infantry Division Historical Society
 "29:Let's Go: The Story of the 29th Infantry Division" (World War II Stars & Stripes History Booklet)
 American D-Day: Omaha Beach, Utah Beach & Pointe du Hoc
 

Divisions of the United States Army National Guard
Infantry divisions of the United States Army
Military units and formations established in 1917
Military units and formations in Maryland
Military units and formations in North Carolina
Military units and formations in Virginia
Infantry Division, U.S. 029th
United States Army divisions of World War I
Infantry divisions of the United States Army in World War II
1917 establishments in Alabama